Martin Kučera (born May 25, 1978) is a Slovak former ice hockey goaltender.

Early life 
Kučera was born in Bratislava. He played in the 1998 World Junior Ice Hockey Championships for Slovakia.

Career 
Kučera played in the Tipsport Liga for HC Slovan Bratislava, MHk 32 Liptovský Mikuláš, HK 36 Skalica and MsHK Žilina. He also played one season in the Elite Ice Hockey League for the Edinburgh Capitals, joining the team in 2005.

References

External links

1978 births
Living people
HSC Csíkszereda players
Edinburgh Capitals players
Gazprom-OGU Orenburg players
MHk 32 Liptovský Mikuláš players
HK 36 Skalica players
Slovak ice hockey goaltenders
HC Slovan Bratislava players
Ice hockey people from Bratislava
MsHK Žilina players
Slovak expatriate ice hockey people
Slovak expatriate sportspeople in Scotland
Expatriate ice hockey players in Scotland
Slovak expatriate ice hockey players in Russia
Slovak expatriate sportspeople in Romania
Expatriate ice hockey players in Romania